Box Hill Hawks Football Club is an Australian rules football club playing in the Victorian Football League. It has an alliance with the Hawthorn Football Club, which plays in the Australian Football League.

Early Australian rules football in Box Hill – 1903 to 1935

Organised Australian rules football within the municipality of Box Hill can be traced back to the year 1903. In that year Mr EFG Hodges, the proprietor of the "Reporter" newspaper, founded the "Reporter District Football Association".  The six foundation teams were Bayswater, Box Hill, Canterbury, Ferntree Gully, Mitcham and Ringwood. This Box Hill team played on a ground approximately 400 metres south of where Box Hill City Oval is located today, the site is now partly occupied by the Box Hill High School and the Box Hill Cemetery.  This team is wholly unrelated to the Box Hill Hawks Football Club of today but was the first team to be known as Box Hill and was the first Australian rules football team in the municipality.

In 1921 a team known as the Box Hill Junior Football Club participated in local competition and in 1923 the Eastern Suburban Protestant Churches Football Association was formed with two teams representing Box Hill; Box Hill United and Box Hill City.  The Box Hill City Football Club was the fore-runner of the present day club and was the first to wear the brown and gold uniform associated with later Box Hill teams.  In 1932 the Eastern Suburban Football League formed with Box Hill City as a foundation member.  In 1935 Box Hill City merged with Box Hill East.  Prior to the 1936 season Box Hill East, Box Hill District and Box Hill Methodists all merged to become the Box Hill Football Club and this event is now generally regarded as the formation of the present day Club.

Eastern Suburbs Football League years – 1936 to 1950

The newly formed Box Hill Football Club played at Surrey Park in 1936 and competed in the ESFL "B" Grade; qualifying for the Grand Final but being defeated by Hartwell.  Both Grand Finalists were promoted to "A" Grade for season 1937 and in its first season in the higher grade Box Hill again reached the Grand Final, this time being defeated by Auburn.

In 1938 the team moved to the newly constructed Box Hill City Oval after the land south of Whitehorse Road was acquired by the Box Hill Cemetery Trust.  The new oval was designed and constructed by the City Engineer, Mr FW Kerr, and provided first class facilities including grand stand with changing rooms and covered races, recorder board, conveniences, committee rooms, timekeeper's box and a kiosk.  Chain mesh partitions were provided for the "inner" and "outer" spectator viewing areas. At the time the ground was regarded as the equal of any in Victoria.

In 1939 the "A" Grade premiership was won but the team withdrew from the ESFL after 11 rounds of the 1940 season as the logistics of fielding a team became impossible due to players enlisting for the War effort.  The ESFL itself went into recess from 1942 to 1944 before resuming in 1945. Box Hill won the 1945 and 1946 "East Section" premierships (with fuel restrictions in force in the years immediately after World War II, the ESFL divided into "East" and "West" sections to minimise travel).  A third consecutive premiership was narrowly missed with the 1947 grand final being lost by 1 point to Mitcham.  Box Hill was again defeated in the 1948 and 1949 grand finals, on each occasion by Ringwood.  In 1950, in what was to prove Box Hill's final season in the ESFL, it lost the first semi-final to Tooronga by 1 point.  During its 11 seasons in the ESFL, Box Hill only failed to qualify for the grand final on 3 occasions – 1938, 1940 (when the club withdrew mid-season) and 1950.

Towards the end of the 1940s the Victorian Football Association adopted an expansionist policy aimed at bringing senior football to the newer and younger suburbs of Melbourne, a policy that would see the VFA increase in numbers from twelve to twenty Clubs by the mid-1960s.  The first two Clubs admitted under this new strategy were Box Hill and Moorabbin who, at the end of the 1950 season, were invited to field teams in the VFA for the 1951 season.

VFA years – 1951 to 1995

The Box Hill Football Club made its debut in the VFA on Saturday 21 April 1951, at Preston. The team lost to Preston 7.9(51) to 16.14(110). Success did not come readily at first as the team largely based on its ESFL players and local juniors struggled to make the transition to senior football.  The only premiership points gained during this first season were recorded in a drawn match against Williamstown at home in Round 13.

Improvement was steady during the early VFA years and the appointment of former Richmond champion and 1948 Brownlow Medallist Bill Morris as playing coach for the 1952 season proved to be an excellent choice. Morris attracted quality footballers to Box Hill and inspired the team through his own efforts. Morris played with Box Hill for three years and won the best and fairest by a huge margin each season and must still be regarded as one of the very best players ever to represent the club.

In 1956 Box Hill made its initial appearance in the VFA finals under captain-coach Col Austen. It defeated Brunswick in the first semi-final before losing to eventual premiers Williamstown in the preliminary final. Austen again guided the club into the finals in 1958, losing the first semi-final to Port Melbourne.

After the high points of 1956 and 1958, during the ensuing seasons Box Hill's performances began to decline.  In 1960 the VFA was a single division of seventeen teams and Box Hill finished tenth.  When divisional football was introduced for the 1961 season Box Hill therefore became the final club admitted to the newly formed ten team first division.

Box Hill finished last in the first division in 1961 and therefore became the first team to be relegated to the VFA second division. Divisional football was conducted in the VFA for 28 years from 1961 to 1988 and Box Hill played a total of 24 seasons in the second division (1962 to 1984, 1986). Only Northcote (25 seasons), Sunshine (25 seasons) and Mordialloc (withdrew 3 rounds into its 25th season) were in the lower division for a longer period of time.

In 1960 the VFA introduced Sunday football which, as the only professional sport played in Melbourne on a Sunday, soon developed a large following and became a financial boon for VFA clubs that hosted Sunday matches. Box Hill, a conservative club in a conservative municipality, at first vigorously opposed the introduction of Sunday football and refused to play Sunday games. Even when the club changed its stance and agreed to play on Sundays in 1966, the Box Hill City Council continued to refuse permission for the club to host Sunday matches at Box Hill City Oval.  Box Hill did not gain Council's permission to play Sunday matches on its own ground until 1969, the final VFA club to do so. Generally the club struggled throughout the 1960s as it suffered financially by not being able to play Sunday Football at home. Through the 1960s, the club relied on a successful Saturday night dance that it hosted at the Box Hill Town Hall for most of its income. Box Hill finished fourth in the second division in 1962 but did not reach the finals again until 1969 when it also finished fourth.

It was around 1968 that the nickname the "Mustangs" was adopted by the Box Hill Football Club. When the Club joined the VFA it was known as the "White Horses" and for a brief period during the mid-1960s was known as the "Stranglers", an obscure name which did not catch on.

Box Hill's improved form during 1969 was the launching place for a successful 1970 season in which it played Coburg in its first VFA grand final.  Box Hill finished third on the ladder and defeated Brunswick in the first semi-final and Sunshine in the preliminary final to qualify for the grand final.  Its opponent Coburg had lost only twice during the course of the season but both of these losses were to Box Hill and the Mustangs were therefore given a good chance of winning promotion. Coburg took the lead early and were never seriously threatened thereafter, winning 20.17(137) to 16.11(107).

After missing the finals narrowly in 1971 and 1972, a financial crisis caused by the collapse of the club's Saturday night dance and promises of large player contracts led to Box Hill granting nearly all of its paid players open clearances prior to the 1973 season.  This precipitated a horror nine-year period for the club; between 1973 and 1981 it played 162 games for 18 wins, 143 losses and 1 draw. During those nine seasons, Box Hill finished last five times and second last four times and failed to win a game in both the 1973 and 1977 seasons.

Box Hill reached its lowest point in November 1980 when the incumbent committee, burdened by huge accumulated debts and years of poor on-field performances, resigned and called a public meeting at which the club was to be disbanded unless a new committee could be formed. A new committee headed by former club President John Zigouras took over the administration of the club and immediately introduced two administrative reforms.  Firstly, former Box Hill player Keith Ralph Jnr was appointed as general manager, making Box Hill the first VFA club to have a full-time, paid administrator. Secondly the club addressed its financial problems by becoming one of the first sporting clubs in Victoria to gain a permit to conduct bingo sessions.

Box Hill's financial position was stabilised in 1981 and thereafter the club's on-field performances improved rapidly culminating in an outstanding 1984 season in which Box Hill claimed its first VFA premiership in overwhelming fashion, losing only two games for the season and achieving the highest ever score and greatest winning margin ever recorded in a VFA grand final in defeating Oakleigh by 135 points, 32.23(215) to 11.14(80).

For Box Hill, in 1985 its first appearance in first division in 24 years unfortunately coincided with the VFA restructuring its competition. In mid-season it was announced that the bottom 3 teams on the first division ladder would be relegated, rather than the last placed club only. The result for Box Hill was that it immediately returned to second division after just 1 year back in the higher grade.

Box Hill responded by immediately claiming the 1986 second division premiership. It won the first 6 games of the season and thereafter maintained a place near the top of the ladder, finishing 2nd with just 3 losses. Box Hill defeated Sunshine in the second semi-final and again in the grand final to claim its 2nd premiership in 3 years. The grand final was closely fought with Box Hill steadying with the final 2 goals of the match to win by 18 points, 14.14(98) to 11.14(80). The grand final was marred by numerous spiteful incidents, with 6 Sunshine players reported on a total of 13 charges. Not one Box Hill player was reported.

Back in first division Box Hill steadily improved and between 1989 and 1994 experienced its most successful period during its years in the VFA competition, with 4 finals appearances in 6 years. In 1989 former Carlton premiership player Peter Francis guided the club to 3rd place, equalling its best VFA result to that time. In 1991 and 1992 Shane Molloy became the first coach to guide the Mustangs into consecutive finals series. In 1994 Box Hill finished 2nd on the ladder and reached its first major VFA grand final under the coaching of John Murphy. Box Hill established a 24-point lead at 3/4 time against the more favoured Sandringham team but was overrun in the final quarter, losing narrowly 10.9(69) to 11.12(78).

Box Hill's most successful VFA era ironically coincided with the decline of the VFA competition and its ultimate demise. (Refer to the article "Victorian Football Association" for more commentary on the factors contributing to the decline of the competition.) After a high point of 24 clubs in 1983, the competition had dwindled to only 12 clubs by the 1994 season and more significantly the central administration of the VFA was in severe financial difficulty. In order to avoid total collapse, the central administration of the VFA relinquished control of the VFA competition at the end of the 1994 season; it was transferred to the Victorian State Football League which had previously been responsible for establishing and administering the TAC Cup competition. The new administration disbanded the VFA Under 19s and did not offer Dandenong Redlegs, Oakleigh and Prahran licenses in the VFA competition for the 1995 season, leaving just 9 clubs to compete for the VFA premiership for the final time. Box Hill narrowly missed the finals in the last year of VFA competition, finishing 6th.

VFL years – 1996 to 2013
The creation of the Australian Football League from the previous Victorian Football League in 1990 had left a structural void within the heartland of Australian rules football, with no Victorian state-based competition to provide a player pathway from the elite Under 18s TAC Cup competition.

In 1995 it was announced that a new state based competition would be formed, to be named the "Victorian Football League", as was its predecessor. Each Club would be linked to a TAC Cup Club and recruiting zone, of which there were to be 8 based in metropolitan Melbourne and 4 in regional Victoria. Initial speculation was that only some of the surviving VFA clubs would be invited, along with a number of stronger metropolitan and regional Clubs. After a period of some uncertainty, all 9 remaining VFA Clubs, along with North Ballarat and Traralgon were granted licences for the first season of the new VFL competition in 1996. Box Hill was granted the licence for the eastern zone of metropolitan Melbourne, with Eastern Ranges becoming its feeder club from the TAC Cup competition. Box Hill's results in the initial VFL years between 1996 and 1999 showed a club which remained competitive but not able to win enough games to qualify for the Finals.

At the end of the 1998 season, the administrations of the AFL and VFL adopted the recommendations of the "Busse Report", which recommended the amalgamation of the Victorian-based AFL Reserve Grade competition with the VFL competition into a revamped and stronger VFL commencing in season 2000. Victorian-based AFL clubs were to be permitted to participate in the VFL competition either by fielding its reserves teams or by entering into an "alignment" partnership with an existing VFL club, whereby the VFL club hosted players from the AFL club, effectively fielding a hybrid team.

Due to the complexities involved in finalising the details of such an arrangement, only 3 AFL clubs participated in an "alignment" partnership in the VFL in 2000. Box Hill and Hawthorn created one of the first such partnerships, considered to be one of the more natural and logical of such arrangements, due to such factors as both clubs wearing brown and gold playing uniforms and Box Hill being geographically located within the heartland of Hawthorn's membership and supporter base.  Moreover, Hawthorn's training base Glenferrie Oval was wholly unsuited to state league football, making the prospect of Hawthorn players playing at a quality suburban venue such as Box Hill City Oval an attractive one for that club. As part of the alignment partnership, Box Hill dropped its "Mustangs" nickname in favour of the "Hawks" nickname of Hawthorn but its brown and gold playing uniform with the large white horse emblem remained unchanged.

The early years of the restructured VFL competition handed a considerable advantage to clubs which had entered into "alignment" partnerships; the blend of full-time, professional AFL listed players with a smaller number of VFL players on most occasions proved to be too strong for "stand alone" VFL clubs composed entirely of part-time, semi-professional footballers. Such was the case for the Box Hill Hawks, which between 2000 and 2005 completed the most successful period of its long history, with 6 consecutive finals appearances.

The Box Hill Hawks claimed its first major division VFL premiership in 2001 under the coaching of former North Melbourne player and Werribee coach Donald McDonald. After finishing the home-and-away season in 2nd place with 15 wins and 5 losses, it defeated Springvale and the Murray Kangaroos to claim a grand final berth against Werribee. Werribee had only lost two games for the season and had twice comfortably defeated the Box Hill Hawks during the home-and-away round, but Box Hill jumped Werribee early and by halfway through the 2nd quarter had established a lead of more than six goals which Werribee was unable to threaten. In the end the Box Hill won comfortably by 37 points, 13.13(91) to Werribee 7.12(54).

The Box Hill Hawks again played in the grand final in 2003 under the coaching of former Western Bulldogs champion and 1990 Brownlow Medallist Tony Liberatore.  During the course of the season, the Box Hill Hawks established a club record of 13 consecutive wins, but after losing the qualifying final to Wiliamstown (Box Hill's 1,000th match in VFA/VFL competition), it defeated Werribee and Sandringham in knock-out finals to qualify for a grand final rematch against Wiliamstown. Wiliamstown, at that time aligned to Collingwood, fielded an unprecedented 16 AFL listed players in its grand final team and proved too strong for the Box Hill Hawks, which fought hard after it trailed by more than seven goals at half-time; Wiliamstown eventually prevailed by 29 points 13.14(92) to the Box Hill Hawks 9.9(63).

The 2004 season saw the Box Hill Hawks stage a dramatic mid-season turn around in its fortunes.  Following a large turn-over of players after the 2003 grand final defeat, Box Hill lost the opening 6 games of the 2004 season under new coach Andy Collins and after 9 rounds was still last on the ladder with just 1 win. It then proceeded to win 12 games out of 13, winning its way through to the preliminary final before losing to Port Melbourne, just one victory away from a third grand final appearance in four seasons. The Box Hill Hawks made a 6th successive finals series in 2005 but bowed out in the first final, well beaten by Port Melbourne, and missed the finals for the next three years.

Box Hill returned the finals in 2009 for the first time since 2005 following a strong recruiting drive which yielded ex-Melbourne player Adem Yze and former AFL listed players Sam Iles and Ed Curnow. Under first-year coach Brendon Bolton, the team finished 5th on the ladder with 12 wins and 6 losses.  It defeated Geelong in the First Elimination Final before narrowly losing an epic semi-final to Port Melbourne 19.10(124) to 19.14 (128) in a game rated as one of the best played in the VFL for many years.

The Box Hill Hawks built on its improved form in 2009 with another strong performance in 2010, again under the leadership of Brendon Bolton.  After an indifferent start to the season, the team came home strongly with seven consecutive wins in the second half of the season to again finish 5th on the ladder. In circumstances uncannily reminiscent of the previous season, the Box Hill Hawks won its Elimination Final in strong fashion and again met Port Melbourne in the First Semi-final. In a tense match played in quagmire conditions on Port Melbourne's home ground; the Box Hill Hawks defeated Port Melbourne for the first time in a finals game 14.11(95) to 12.17(89); the winning goal coming in the dying seconds.  North Ballarat ended the Box Hill Hawks season in the Preliminary Final the following week, the match played at Box Hill City Oval.

Under a new senior coach, Springvale games record holder Damian Carroll, the Box Hill Hawks experienced an inconsistent season in 2011, winning just 7 games and losing a number by narrow margins to fall into 8th place on the ladder and qualify for a 3rd successive finals appearance. With a severely weakened team due to Hawthorn resting a number of its A.F.L. players, the Box Hill Hawks fought hard in the Elimination Final against Werribee before going down by 26 points.

ESFL records

Grand Final appearances – 1936 to 1950

ESFL season by season record – 1936 to 1950

* Denotes Finals appearance

1940 – Box Hill withdrew after 11 rounds.  Its remaining 7 games for the season were awarded to its scheduled opponent on forfeit.
1941 – Box Hill did not participate
1942 to 1944 – Competition suspended

VFA/VFL Competition Awards

Division One or Single Division (1951 to 1961, 1985, 1987 to 2019)

Division Two (1962 to 1984, 1986)

VFA / VFL Records

VFA / VFL Grand Final appearances

Senior Grade – 1951 to 2019

Reserve Grade – 1951 to 2017 (competition disbanded at end of 2017 season)

Thirds Grade – 1952 to 1994

VFA / VFL highs and lows

Senior Grade – 1951 to 2019

* Sequence of losses ended by a draw followed by 4 further losses, i.e. 33 matches without a win.

Reserve Grade – 1951 to 2017 (competition disbanded at end of 2017 season)

Thirds Grade – 1952 to 1994

VFA / VFL Best and Fairests

Senior Grade – 1951 to 2019

Reserve Grade – 1951 to 2017 (competition disbanded at end of 2017 season)

Thirds Grade – 1952 to 1994

VFA / VFL Competition Leading Goalkickers

Senior Grade – 1951 to 2019

Reserve Grade – 1951 to 2017* (competition disbanded at end of 2017 season)

Thirds Grade – 1952 to 1994*

* Records of Reserve Grade and Thirds Grade Goalkickers prior to 1989 are incomplete.  Only known competition leading goalkickers are listed above.

VFA / VFL record against other clubs – 1951 to 2019

Senior Grade – 1951 to 2019

Reserve Grade – 1951 to 2017 (competition disbanded at end of 2017 season)

Thirds Grade – 1952 to 1994

VFA / VFL season by season record – 1951 to 2019

Senior Grade – 1951 to 2019

* Denotes Finals appearance

Reserve Grade – 1951 to 2017 (competition disbanded at end of 2017 season)

* Denotes Finals appearance

Thirds Grade – 1952 to 1994

* Denotes Finals appearance

VFA / VFL Player Records – 1951 to 2019

Career Totals of 100 Senior VFA / VFL Games

* Games total to end of 2019 season – played for Box Hill Hawks in season 2019.

Career Totals of 100 Senior VFA / VFL Goals

Executive officers, coach, captain, club champion and leading goalkicker – 1951 to 2019

* General Manager from 1981

Current squad

Honours overview

Box Hill players drafted to AFL

* Indicates AFL listed player in 2022.
All games totals to the end of the 2022 season.

The above list contains players who have played at least 1 AFL game or are currently on an AFL list and yet to play an AFL game.
The following players were drafted from Box Hill but did not play an AFL game: Ashley Byrne (Brisbane – 1991 Mid-Season Draft); Paul Mullarvey (Fitzroy – 1993 National Draft); Matthew Penny (Carlton – 1993 Pre-Season Draft); Michael Georgiadis (Hawthorn – 2002 Rookie Draft); Clinton Alleway (North Melbourne – 2003 Rookie Draft); Doug Scott (Hawthorn – 2004 Pre-Season Draft); Kristan Height (Hawthorn – 2005 Rookie Draft).

"Greatest Ever Team"
(as announced in 2000, covering period 1951 to 2000)

"Box Hill Hawks All Stars"
(as announced on 24 August 2019 to celebrate 20 seasons of the Box Hill – Hawthorn Alignment 2000 to 2019)

Box Hill Hawks Football Club in popular culture

 On Sunday 26 June 1988 at a match between Box Hill and Frankston played at Box Hill City Oval, Box Hill coach Harold Martin rode on a cherry picker while delivering his 3/4 time address to the Box Hill team.  Martin was serving a suspension that prevented him from entering the playing arena.  He circumvented the ban by being hoisted by the cherry picker over the boundary fence and several metres inside the playing arena without actually touching the ground.  The incident has been recounted and referred to in several publications since in the context of describing extreme acts that coaches have undertaken in an attempt to motivate their teams.
 In an episode of Kath & Kim, Brett and Kim are shown at a suburban football match.  Both are wearing brown and gold scarves and ABC footage of a VFA match played in 1988 between Box Hill and Preston is used. Peter Rowsthorn, who plays the role of Brett, has been Number One Ticket Holder of the Box Hill Hawks Football Club since 2005.

Club song
The club song is identical to the Hawthorn Football Club song, except that "Box Hill" is substituted for "Hawthorn", and is sung to the tune of the Yankee Doodle Dandy.

Women's team
Box Hill were granted a license to compete in the VFL Women's league in 2017. The club won three out of fourteen games in the 2017 season. The license was transferred to AFL-aligned club , who participated in the league under that name from 2018 to 2022, winning the premiership in the 2018 season. In 2023, following Hawthorn's ascension to the AFL Women's competition, the VFLW license was returned to Box Hill, and the club has played under that name in the league ever since.

Jumpers

1936 to 1974
Brown jumper with a gold vee and small white horse emblem on left hand breast.  The white horse emblem was added prior to the 1938 season, coinciding with the club's move from Surrey Park to Box Hill City Oval.

1975 to 2011
Prior to the 1975 season, the VFA encouraged a number of its member Clubs to adopt a more colourful playing uniform to coincide with the introduction of colour television to Australia.  Box Hill adopted its iconic and most widely recognised jumper, consisting of gold and brown vertical thirds (brown in the middle), with a brown back, gold numbers, and a large white "Wild Mustang" logo in the centre of the front of the jumper.

2012 to present
Box Hill adopted the identical jumper to its AFL affiliate Hawthorn, the only difference being that the white "Wild Mustang" logo was retained, located in the centre of the front of the jumper and approximately half the size that it was previously.

References

 "Box Hill Football Club Yearbook", Box Hill Football Club, Melbourne, 1951
 "Box Hill Football Club Souvenir History", Box Hill Football Club, Melbourne, 1961
 "Box Hill Football Club Souvenir History", Box Hill Football Club, Melbourne, 2000
 Box Hill Hawks Football Club 57th Annual Report 2007
 Box Hill Hawks Football Club 58th Annual Report 2008

External links

Official website
Full Points Footy Profile for Box Hill Hawks

Victorian Football League clubs
Australian rules football clubs in Melbourne
1936 establishments in Australia
Australian rules football clubs established in 1936
Australian Reserve team football
Sport in the City of Whitehorse